Dora María Téllez Argüello (born 1955) is a Nicaraguan historian known for her involvement in the Nicaraguan Revolution. As a young university medical student in León in the 1970s, Téllez was recruited by the Sandinista National Liberation Front (FSLN). Téllez went on to become a comandante and fought alongside later president Daniel Ortega in the revolution that ousted dictator Anastasio Somoza Debayle in 1979. In the subsequent FSLN government, she served as Health Minister under Ortega and has also been an advocate for women's rights. She ultimately became a critic of repression and corruption under President Ortega and left the FSLN in 1995 to found the party Sandinista Renovation Movement (MRS), later renamed Unamos. Along with several other opposition figures, she was arrested in June 2021 by the Ortega government.

Operation Chanchera 
An increase in government repression and rise of political prisoners being taken prompted Téllez to go underground in 1976. While underground she did educational work in the mountains.

As "Commander Two", at age 22, she was third in command in Operation Chanchera,  on August 22, 1978, that occupied the Nicaraguan National Palace in Managua, where the Nicaraguan National Assembly was in session. The revolutionaries captured 1,500 civilian hostages and threatened their lives unless their demands were met. The demands included a prisoner release and a monetary ransom. There was a subsequent release of key Sandinista political prisoners and a million-dollar ransom payment, which Téllez played a role in negotiating. This event revealed the potential vulnerability of the Somoza regime and helped the FSLN win support from Latin American governments and unite and mobilize diverse factions of the opposition to the regime.  Following the operation, thousands of youths and women joined the Sandinista movement. A popular insurrection grew along with the FSLN and contributed to the fall of the Somoza regime on July 19, 1979.

Military commander during the Nicaraguan Civil War
Upon her arrival in Panama with the released Sandinistas in August 1978, Téllez trained in Cuba and Panama to become a military commander. In February 1979 she was back fighting in Nicaragua and she went on to establish a place in the Tercerista leadership structure. For five months she led Sandinista platoons throughout the country in skirmishes with the Nicaraguan National Guard: first in the Southern Front with Edén Pastora's forces, and later in Central and northern Nicaragua. According to Sandinista Commander Mónica Baltodano, her raids on the northern provinces in conjunction with Cmdr Leticia Herrera columns surprised the enemy constantly and succeeded in dispersing their forces to take advantage.

Finally, she led the Sandinista units fighting the enemy's elite forces block by block for six consecutive weeks until they captured the city of León in June 1979, the first major city to fall to the Sandinistas in the Revolution. This was followed by the fall of Managua two weeks later and the installation of the Sandinista Provisional Government Junta in this city soon after.

Public service in the Sandinista Movement
She served as Minister of Health from 1979 to 1990 in the first Sandinista administration. The administration's public health campaign won Nicaragua the UN Educational, Scientific, and Cultural Organization's prize for exceptional health progress. Specifically, Téllez has been quoted discussing the specific health inequalities present in the mining industry in Nicaragua.

Within the Sandinista government, Téllez held positions alongside religious figures to advocate for gay and lesbian rights, as well as reproductive rights for women in Nicaragua.

Political career
Early experience within the FSLN political party included Téllez's position as the Political Secretary for Managua. Téllez also served as a member of the Council of the State. The first congress of the FSLN had an election in 1990 which prompted discontent regarding the election process; however the Directorate decided that the election of a new body would nevertheless be done by slate rather than by voting for individual members. This stunted the potential political candidacy of Téllez, who was being supported by many rank-and-file members. Téllez would have been the Directorate's first female member.

In 1995 Téllez co-founded the Sandinista Renovation Movement (MRS) after resigning her seat in the FSLN. Other former Sandinistas such as Ernesto Cardenal and Sergio Ramírez have joined the MRS political party. The MRS political party opposed the current corruption in the Nicaraguan government and appointed Herty Lewites to run as the party's candidate in the 2006 presidential election against Daniel Ortega. Four months before the election was to be held, Lewites died of natural causes. Ortega, who had been president from 1985 to 1990, won the presidential election and regained political power in Nicaragua.

On 4 June 2008, Téllez began a hunger strike to protest the "dictatorship of Daniel Ortega", her former comrade-in-arms. Ortega and his supporters stripped the MRS of its legal status about one week later. Téllez suspended her hunger strike on June 16, after doctors told her she would suffer irreparable damage if she continued her fast. She vowed to begin "a new stage of struggle" against what she termed the dictatorial policies of Daniel Ortega.

In June 2021, she was arrested by the Ortega government in a wave of arrests of opposition presidential candidates in the 2021 Nicaraguan general election as well as other opposition leaders. She was sentenced in February 2022.

Academic life as a historian
Téllez wrote publications on Nicaraguan history that underscore the importance of the north-central region of the country to the nation's political and economic history. In 2004 she was appointed Robert F. Kennedy Visiting Professor in Latin American studies at the Harvard Divinity School, but was barred from obtaining an entry visa to the United States under the Patriot Act, on grounds that she was a terrorist, citing as evidence the raid on the Nicaraguan National Palace in Managua. This prompted 122 members of the academic community from Harvard and 15 other North American universities to publish a statement in her defense, stating:

References

External links 
 Global Feminisms Project: Nicaragua

1955 births
Nicaraguan revolutionaries
Living people
Latin Americanists
Sandinista National Liberation Front politicians
Sandinista Renovation Movement politicians
Women in war in Central America
People of the Nicaraguan Revolution
Women in warfare post-1945
20th-century Nicaraguan women politicians
20th-century Nicaraguan politicians
Nicaraguan historians
Women historians
Health ministers of Nicaragua
Women government ministers of Nicaragua